Ji-eun, also spelled Jee-eun, Ji-un or Jee-un, is a Korean feminine given name. Its meaning differs based on the hanja used to write each syllable of the name. There are 61 hanja with the reading "ji" and 30 hanja with the reading "eun" on the South Korean government's official list of hanja which may be used in given names. It was the fourth most popular name for baby girls in South Korea in 1980, rising to second place in 1988, where it remained in 1990.

People
People with this name include:

Entertainers
Im Ji-eun (born 1973), South Korean actress
Park Ji-eun (born 1976), South Korean screenwriter
Kang Ye-won (born Kim Ji-eun, 1980), South Korean actress
Oh Ji-eun (born 1981), South Korean actress
Song Jieun (born 1990), South Korean idol singer, member of Secret
IU (singer) (born Lee Ji-eun, 1993), South Korean singer
Han Ji-eun (born 1987), South Korean actress
Kim Ji-eun (born 1993), South Korean actress

Sportspeople
Lee Ji-eun (footballer) (born 1979), South Korean footballer
Grace Park (golfer) (born Park Ji-eun, 1979), South Korean professional golfer
Um Ji-eun (born 1987), South Korean freestyle wrestler
Choi Ji-eun (born 1988), South Korean figure skater
Lee Ji-eun (swimmer) (born 1989), South Korean swimmer
Kang Gee-eun (born 1990), South Korean sport shooter
Song Ji-eun (handballer) (born 1996), South Korean handballer

See also
List of Korean given names

References

Korean feminine given names